Jorge Molina Valdivieso (born 16 February 1932) is a Chilean politician who served as President of the Chamber of Deputies and as a member of the Chamber of Deputies, representing District 12 of the Valparaíso Region.

References

1932 births
Living people
Presidents of the Chamber of Deputies of Chile
Christian Democratic Party (Chile) politicians
Popular Unitary Action Movement politicians
Members of the MAPU Obrero Campesino
Socialist Party of Chile politicians
Party for Democracy (Chile) politicians
Pontifical Catholic University of Valparaíso alumni